Historically, Renton Hill was a neighborhood of Seattle, Washington, United States. Centered roughly at 18th Avenue and Madison Street, it was roughly the southern part of today's Capitol Hill plus a large adjacent section south of Madison Street. It was named after lumberman and merchant Captain William Renton (1818-1891) and replaced the earlier name of Second Hill.

The Renton Hill Community Improvement Club was the city's first community club, organized in 1901 for public improvements such as water, sidewalks, lighting, and beautification. Along with the Capitol Hill Community Club, the club reorganized in 1929 to exclude racial minorities, using a restrictive covenant. This was in reaction to encroaching African American population from the east, Asian from the south, and urban downtown from the west.

The name Renton Hill has fallen into disuse within Seattle, possibly to avoid confusion with a neighborhood in nearby Renton, WA, also named Renton Hill. The portion of Renton Hill north of Madison Street has been subsumed into Capitol Hill while the portion south of it is now commonly referred to as Cherry Hill.

Notes

See also
 Cherry Hill, Seattle, Washington

Neighborhoods in Seattle